Acritodon is a genus of moss in the family Hypnaceae.

It contains the following species:
 Acritodon nephophilus

References

Hypnaceae
Moss genera
Taxonomy articles created by Polbot